David Junior (Nova Iguaçu, December 8, 1985) is a Brazilian actor.

Career 
He began to study theater at the age of 22, after small participations in soap operas, in 2016, through tests, obtained the paper of the slave Saviano in the series Liberdade, Liberdade of the Rede Globo. His participation in the plot of the eleven caused uproar when performing a scene of sex with Dionísia, represented by Maite Proença, and to appear naked. With this scene, its work reverberated in the social networks and it happened to be recognized to the public, and to gain prominence in the television.

In 2017, interpreted the businessman Dom in the telenovela Pega Pega. In the plot, he was an executive created in Europe, by his adopted mother Sabine, personage of Irene Ravache and administered the company along with the mother. After the end of the novel, due to the great success of his character, renewed contract for 3 years with the Rede Globo. In 2018, he played the role of the slave Menelau in the telenovela O Tempo Não Para.

Filmography

Television

Cinema

References

External links 

1986 births
Brazilian male actors
Living people
Singing talent show winners